HMAS Geranium (formerly HMS Geranium) was an  sloop built in Scotland and launched in 1915. The ship was operated by the Royal Navy as a minesweeper from 1915 until 1919, when she was transferred to the Royal Australian Navy (RAN) for use as a survey ship between 1919 and 1927. The ship was decommissioned in 1927 and scrapped during 1932, with the remains scuttled in 1935.

Design and construction

Geranium was one of 56 Arabis-class sloops built for the Royal Navy during World War I. The sloops-of-war were intended for minesweeping duties in European waters.

Geranium had a displacement of 1,250 tons. The propulsion system consisted of a four-cylinder triple expansion engine, connected to a single propeller shaft. Up to 250 tons of coal could be carried.

Geranium was laid down for the Royal Navy by the Greenock & Grangemouth Dockyard Company, Greenock, Scotland, in August 1915 and launched on 8 November 1915. She was delivered to the Royal Navy on 18 March 1916.

Operational history
Geranium joined the Mediterranean Fleet after commissioning, being based at Malta.

After World War I, Geranium and two sister ships ( and ) were sent to Australia to clear mines deployed by the German auxiliary cruiser . Despite hard work in rough seas, the ships only found one mine.

Geranium and the other two ships were transferred to the Royal Australian Navy on 18 October 1919. The ships' minesweeper design made them suitable for handling survey equipment, and Geranium entered RAN service as the navy's first survey ship. The ship was poorly designed for survey duties in tropical Australian waters: she was designed for the North Sea climate, and was required to carry a ship's company of 113, 36 more than the intended ship's company of 77. In 1923, the sloop ran aground on an uncharted reef off Vanderlin Island in the Gulf of Carpentaria. The ship's company were able to refloat the ship and patch the damage, and after repairs in Sydney, the ship resumed northern survey operations. In October, Geranium rescued the civilian steamship Montoro after she struck Young Reef.

In early 1924, the ship ran aground again in the MacArthur River. The ship was refloated and repaired. Later that year, Geranium was fitted to carry a Fairey IIID seaplane: the first RAN survey vessel to carry an aircraft. In May 1927, the survey ship assisted the steamship Tasman, which had hit a reef off Clarke Island.

Decommissioning and fate
Geranium paid off in 1927. The ship was broken up for scrap at Cockatoo Island Dockyard during 1932, and the stripped hulk was sunk as a target in the Tasman Sea outside Sydney Heads on 24 April 1935.

Citations

References

 

World War I sloops of the United Kingdom
Arabis-class sloops of the Royal Australian Navy
Ships built on the River Clyde
1915 ships
Maritime incidents in 1935
Ships sunk as targets
Shipwrecks in the Tasman Sea
Scuttled vessels of New South Wales